The 1993 Swift Mighty Meaties season was the fourth season of the franchise in the Philippine Basketball Association (PBA).

Summary
In the All-Filipino Cup, Swift won their last two games in the eliminations and swept all four of their quarterfinal assignments for a six-game winning streak going into their best-of-five semifinal series against Coney Island (formerly Purefoods). The Mighty Meaties won twice over the Ice Cream Stars in two previous meetings only to be swept in three games by Coney Island in their semifinal series. 

Swift has found the right import in Ronnie Thompkins after sending home their original choice Ledell Eackles, a starter from the Washington Bullets in the NBA who was overweight when he came here. The Mighty Meaties won their first six games in the Commissioner's Cup and emerge with the best record in the eliminations with nine wins and two losses. Swift made it to the finals with the conference-best 15-4 won-loss slate. They won their second PBA crown with a 4-2 series victory over Purefoods Oodles, stopping their corporate rival's bid for a second straight crown of the season and exacting revenge over the team that beat them in the All-Filipino finals two years ago.

In the Governors Cup, the Mighty Meaties struggled early in the eliminations by dropping three of their first five games with most of the blame on import Tony Harris. Swift were able to regain their winning ways and won their last five games in the eliminations for a 7-3 won-loss record. The semifinal round was a roller-coaster ride for the Mighty Meaties, losing and winning each time in their outings and won their last game against Purefoods, 114-112 on November 26, to earn a playoff for a finals berth.  

Swift had to go through two sudden-death playoffs against Pepsi Mega and Sta.Lucia to enter the finals against San Miguel Beermen. The Mighty Meaties, which lost all three of their previous matches with the Beermen going into the championship series, were beaten in five games.

Notable dates
March 2: Nelson Asaytono scored 46 points as Swift won their first game of the season with a 113-103 win over Alaska Milk.

June 27: In the battle of unbeaten teams, Swift defeated Shell Helix for their fourth win in a row, 124-116.  

July 18: In a highly-anticipated match-up, the Mighty Meaties scored an easy 132-108 win over Purefoods Oodles for their seventh win in eight games. The Oodles before the game were coming off a six-game winning streak since the arrival of their import Carey Scurry. 

September 28: Tony Harris scored 74 points to lead Swift to a 124-107 win over Pepsi Mega.

Occurrences
On July 25, the Swift Mighty Meaties beat Shell Helix Oilers, 118-117 in overtime on Terry Saldaña's last-second basket. That game featured a rumble and players banished from the playing court during the second quarter. The ugly incident started when Shell forward Ricky Relosa hit Swift import Ronnie Thompkins in the nape during a scuffle underneath the Swift basket and a brief chase ensued. The five players ejected for their involvement in the brawl were Relosa and Mulong Orillosa of Shell, Ronnie Thompkins, Zaldy Realubit and Cadel Mosqueda of Swift.

Awards
 Ronnie Thompkins won Best Import honors in the Commissioner's Cup.
 Vergel Meneses was voted Commissioner's Cup finals MVP, the Aerial Voyager was also named the season's Most Improved Player.

Roster

Transactions

Additions

Trades

Subtractions
{| cellspacing="0"
| valign="top" |

Recruited imports

References

Pop Cola Panthers seasons
Swift